Arthur Josef Alwin Wieferich (April 27, 1884 – September 15, 1954) was a German mathematician and teacher, remembered for his work on number theory, as exemplified by a type of prime numbers named after him.

He was born in Münster, attended the University of Münster (1903–1909) and then worked as a school teacher and tutor until his retirement in 1949. He married in 1916 and had no children.

Wieferich abandoned his studies after his graduation and did not publish any paper after 1909. His mathematical reputation is founded on five papers he published while a student at Münster:

.
.
.
.
.

The first three papers are related to Waring's problem. His fourth paper led to the term Wieferich prime, which are p such that p^2 divides 2^(p-1) - 1.

See also
Wieferich pair
Wieferich's theorem
Wieferich prime

External links
 Arthur Josef Alwin Wieferich, obituary at numbertheory.org

References

1884 births
1954 deaths
20th-century German mathematicians
Number theorists
People from Münster